Incheh-ye Hajj Mohammad (also Romanized as Īncheh-ye Ḩājj Moḩammad; also known as ‘Abdolābād, Īncheh-ye Soflá, and Īnjeh-ye Soflá) is a village in Chaybasar-e Jonubi Rural District, in the Central District of Maku County, West Azerbaijan Province, Iran. At the 2006 census, its population was 34, in 8 families.

References 

Populated places in Maku County